The term Snigole may refer to:

People 
 Snigole, a rare name.

Names 
 Snigole River, a tributary of the Malbaie River flowing in the unorganized territory of Mont-Élie, in Clermont, in MRC of Charlevoix-Est, in Quebec, in Canada.
 Chemin Snigole, Clermont, in Quebec, in Canada.
 Fall of the Snigole River, falls of the Snigole River in Clermont, in Quebec, in Canada.